WHIO-FM (95.7 MHz) – branded AM 1290 and News 95.7 WHIO – is a commercial talk radio station licensed to serve Pleasant Hill, Ohio, covering Dayton, Ohio and the Dayton metropolitan area. Owned by Cox Media Group, WHIO-FM acts as a full-time simulcast of WHIO. The WHIO-FM studios are located at Cox Media Center building in Dayton, while the transmitter is located in nearby Piqua. In addition to a standard analog transmission, WHIO-FM streams online.

History
On November 30, 1960, the station signed on as WPTW-FM.  Its original city of license was Piqua, and it largely simulcast co-owned WPTW 1570 AM. WPTW-FM served as an extension of the AM station's programming, as WPTW originally operated as a daytime-only station.

By the late 1960s, WPTW played middle of the road music using a sophisticated reel-to-reel automation system, while the FM had a beautiful music format, playing 15 minute sweeps of instrumental cover versions of popular songs, at first with no vocals. The exception was the "Dell-O Morning Show" hosted by Dell Olmay, and heard on both stations. WPTW-FM's station identification remained until 1974 as: "This is WPTW...FM Stereo...transmitting from Piqua, Ohio." It began using both Piqua and Troy in its legal I.D. in 1975.

After Federal Communications Commission rules changed regarding daytimer AM stations operating on Mexican "clear channel frequencies", 1570 WPTW was finally given approval by the FCC in 1986 to broadcast around the clock. That led WPTW-FM to end all simulcasting.  WPTW-FM could carry a separate format and image, including a change in its call sign.

Soft Adult Contemporary (1989-1993) 
After the original WHIO-FM 99.1 flipped to country music from easy listening in 1989, WPTW-FM management wanted to quickly fill the hole.  The station continued its own easy format, but changed its call letters to WCLR with the moniker "Clear 95."  Later that year, in an effort to attract younger listeners, WCLR began adding more vocals to its easy format. WCLR made a full switch to Soft Adult Contemporary a short time later, still under the "Clear 95" name with the "Lite and Easy Favorites" slogan.

Oldies (1993-2000) 
In early 1993, WCLR switched to an oldies format playing the hits of the 1950s through the early 1970s as "Kool 95." Later that year, it purchased WDJK in nearby Xenia, flipping the call letters to WZLR and simulcasting the oldies format on both 95.3 and 95.7. In mid-1997 after the stations were purchased by Cox Media Group, the moniker was changed to "Oldies 95", keeping the same format.

Classic Hits (2000-2006) 
In 2000, the station switched from oldies to classic hits, covering the top songs from the late 1970s through the 1980s.  It changed its call letters to WDPT and switched its moniker to "The Point."  It only continued the simulcast with 95.3 for a short time, before the Xenia station flipped to classic rock as "The Eagle." 95.7 The Point, and its mostly 1980s format, was consulted by Randy Kabrich, who had programmed WRBQ/Tampa in the mid-to-late 1980s.

News/Talk (2006-present) 
In October 2006, after playing "Don't You (Forget About Me)" by Simple Minds, WDPT's music format ended. The station began a simulcast of WHIO, using the call sign WHIO-FM.

In July 2011, the station changed its "community of license" from Piqua, Ohio, to Pleasant Hill, Ohio, even though the transmitter did not move.  This change was reportedly necessitated by FCC requirements that the station's main studio be located within 25 miles of its community of license.  With the move of Cox Media Group facilities to the South Main Street location, Piqua no longer met that requirement, but Pleasant Hill does.  That rule was eliminated by the FCC in October 2017.

Programming
WHIO-FM personality Larry Hansgen hosts the morning-drive program, Miami Valley's Morning News. Brian Kilmeade's late-morning program, produced by Fox News Talk and distributed by Westwood One, airs in late mornings. The Mark Kaye Show (based at WOKV-FM) and The Sean Hannity Show (via Premiere Networks) airs in middays and afternoons. The Evening Edge with Todd Hollst, airs from 6pm to 8pm. The Evening Edge also airs Sunday nights from 7pm to 9pm, and is simulcast on WOKV in Jacksonville, Florida, KRMG in Tulsa, Oklahoma and tape delayed on WSB-AM in Atlanta, Georgia from 9pm to 11pm. The Erik Erickson show and Dana Loesch air in the evening hours, respectively. Coast to Coast AM (via Premiere) airs in the overnight hours.

WHIO-FM also serves as the radio home for University of Dayton Flyers football and basketball.

References

External links

Greater Cincinnati Radio Guide

HIO-FM
News and talk radio stations in the United States
Cox Media Group
Radio stations established in 1960
1960 establishments in Ohio